Ellen Mundinger (born 14 January 1955) is a German athlete. She competed in the women's high jump at the 1972 Summer Olympics, representing West Germany.

References

1955 births
Living people
People from Oberkirch (Baden)
Sportspeople from Freiburg (region)
German female high jumpers
Olympic athletes of West Germany
Athletes (track and field) at the 1972 Summer Olympics